The 1916 University of New Mexico football team was an American football team that represented the University of New Mexico as an independent during the 1916 college football season. In its sixth and final season under head coach Ralph Hutchinson (who was also the university's first athletic director), the team compiled a 3–2 record and outscored opponents by a total of 216 to 70. Carl D. Brorien was the team captain.

The team shut out its opponents in the final three games by a combined score of 214 to 0. The 108-0 victory over  remains the largest margin of victory in program history.

Schedule

References

University of New Mexico
New Mexico Lobos football seasons
University of New Mexico football